Lisa Odynski (born 29 December 1974) is an American snowboarder, born in Reno, Nevada. She competed in women's parallel giant slalom at the 2002 Winter Olympics in Salt Lake City.

References

1974 births
Living people
American female snowboarders
Olympic snowboarders of the United States
Snowboarders at the 1998 Winter Olympics
Snowboarders at the 2002 Winter Olympics
21st-century American women